In mathematics, a monopole is a connection over a principal bundle G with a section of the associated adjoint bundle.

Physical interpretation

Physically, the section can be interpreted as a Higgs field, where the connection and Higgs field should satisfy the Bogomolny equations and be of finite action.

See also 

 Nahm equations
 Instanton
 Magnetic monopole
 Yang–Mills theory

References 

Differential geometry
Mathematical physics